Archstone was a real estate investment trust that invested in apartments. In 2007, the company was acquired by Tishman Speyer and Lehman Brothers and, in 2013, the company's assets were acquired by Equity Residential and AvalonBay Communities.

At the time of the liquidation of the company in 2013, it owned over 40,000 apartment units.

History
In 1998, Security Capital Pacific Trust and Security Capital Atlantic Inc. merged to form Archstone Communities. The merged company owned 304 properties and 90,166 apartments. Security Capital had been founded by William D. Sanders in 1990.

In 2001, the company acquired Charles E. Smith Residential Realty, the apartment company founded by Charles E. Smith and the largest real estate owner in the Washington, D.C. metropolitan area, in a $2.2 billion transaction.

In 2007, the company was acquired by Tishman Speyer and Lehman Brothers in a $22.2 billion transaction. At that time, the company owned interests in 359 apartment communities including 87,667 apartment units. On February 27, 2013, Equity Residential and AvalonBay Communities closed a $9 billion deal to acquire the company from Lehman Brothers.

References

2012 mergers and acquisitions
2007 mergers and acquisitions
American companies established in 1946
Defunct real estate companies of the United States
Real estate companies established in 1946
American companies disestablished in 2013
Smith family (real estate)